The Asia/Oceania Zone was one of three zones of regional Federation Cup qualifying competition in 1993.  All ties were played at the National Tennis Centre in Colombo, Sri Lanka on clay courts.

The nine teams were divided into three pools of three to compete in round-robin matches. After each of the ties had been played, the teams that finished first and second in each of the respective pools would then move on to the play-off stage of the competition. The team that won the knockout stage would go on to advance to the World Group.

Pool Stage
Date: 3–4 May

Play-offs

Date: 5 May

 ,  and  advanced to World Group.

References

 Fed Cup Profile, Indonesia
 Fed Cup Profile, Thailand
 Fed Cup Profile, China
 Fed Cup Profile, Chinese Taipei
 Fed Cup Profile, New Zealand
 Fed Cup Profile, Sri Lanka

See also
Fed Cup structure

 
Asia Oceania
Sport in Colombo
Tennis tournaments in Sri Lanka